This is a list of mayors of the Halifax Regional Municipality.  Halifax's first Mayor, Walter Fitzgerald, was elected in 1996 after the municipality was created by amalgamation. The Mayor of the Halifax holds the highest office in the municipal government of Halifax. The mayor is elected at large during municipal elections, held every four years, and is the head of the Halifax Regional Council.

List

See also
 List of mayors of Halifax, Nova Scotia for a list of mayors for the City of Halifax, from 1841 - 1996.
 List of mayors of Dartmouth, Nova Scotia for a list of mayors for the City of Dartmouth, from 1873 - 1996.
 List of mayors of Bedford, Nova Scotia for a list of mayors for the Town of Bedford, from 1979 - 1996.
 List of wardens of Halifax County, Nova Scotia for a list of wardens for Halifax County, from 1880 - 1996.

Halifax Regional Municipality, Nova Scotia
Mayors of Halifax Regional Municipality
Government in Halifax, Nova Scotia
Mayors